Anita Blair may refer to:

 Anita K. Blair (born 1950), US government official
 Anita Lee Blair (1916–2010), first blind woman elected to any state legislature in the US